Clyde Taylor Ellis (December 21, 1908 – February 9, 1980) was an American politician and a U.S. Representative from Arkansas.

Biography
Born on a farm near Garfield, Arkansas, Ellis was the son of Cecil Oscar and Minerva Jane Taylor Ellis. He attended the public schools of Fayetteville, Arkansas. He also attended the University of Arkansas at Fayetteville from which he received a B.S.; the school of law at the same university; as well as George Washington University Law School and American University in Washington, D.C. He married Izella Baker on December 20, 1931, and they had two daughters, Patricia Suzanne Ellis Marti and Mary Lynn Ellis Duty.

Career
Ellis was a teacher in the rural schools at Garfield, Arkansas in 1927 and 1928; then Superintendent of Schools at Garfield, Arkansas from 1929 to 1934. Admitted to the bar in 1933, he commenced practice at Bentonville, Arkansas. He served in the State House of Representatives from 1933 to 1935, and as member of the State Senate from 1935 to 1939. He was a delegate to the Democrat National Convention in 1940.

Elected as a Democrat to the Seventy-sixth Congress, Ellis was reelected to the Seventy-seventh Congress, and served from January 3, 1939 to January 3, 1943.  He was not a candidate for reelection in 1942 but was an unsuccessful candidate for the Democratic nomination for United States Senator.

Ellis served as combat officer, Lieutenant, in the United States Navy from 1943 to 1945. He was the first general manager (CEO) of the National Rural Electric Cooperative Association in Washington, D.C., from January 1943 until his retirement in September 1967. He was appointed as special consultant to the Secretary of Agriculture, January 1968 to January 1969, and served as special area development assistant to Senator John L. McClellan from February 1971 until 1977. He returned to the staff of the Secretary of Agriculture and was employed there until his retirement in August 1979. He resided in Chevy Chase, Maryland.

Ellis was known as "Mr. Rural Electrification" and wrote a book titled "A Giant Step," which was published in 1966.   The work was dedicated "...to the people of the rural electrification program – past and present."   It is semi-autobiographical and describes relevant contributions from many of the greatest proponents of rural electrification that Ellis came to work with in his career.

Death
Ellis died from a stroke in Washington, D.C., on February 9, 1980 (age 71 years, 50 days). He is interred at Arlington National Cemetery, Arlington, Virginia.  He was the father of two children and the grandfather of Diana West, a noted author and lecturer on breastfeeding issues.

References

External links

 

1908 births
1980 deaths
American cooperative organizers
United States Navy officers
Burials at Arlington National Cemetery
Democratic Party members of the United States House of Representatives from Arkansas
George Washington University Law School alumni
20th-century American politicians